Lucas Alberto Quiroz (born 27 January 1997) is an Argentine professional footballer who plays as a midfielder for 9 de Julio.

Career
Quiroz began his career with Atlético de Rafaela. He appeared in a matchday squad for the first time in June 2016 for a Copa Argentina tie with Ferro Carril Oeste, though he wasn't selected off the bench by Juan Manuel Llop. He was again an unused sub in the cup two years later against Defensores de Belgrano, which preceded his professional debut arriving on 27 August 2018 in a Primera B Nacional win over Quilmes. January 2019 saw Quiroz depart on loan to Central Norte. He scored four goals in fourteen Torneo Regional Federal Amateur matches.

In January 2020, a second loan to the fourth tier was confirmed as he joined Ben Hur. One goal in three matches arrived, in a campaign that was stopped due to the COVID-19 pandemic. In the succeeding August, Quiroz terminated his contract with Rafaela.

Career statistics
.

References

External links

1997 births
Living people
People from Rafaela
Argentine footballers
Association football midfielders
Primera Nacional players
Atlético de Rafaela footballers
Central Norte players
Club Sportivo Ben Hur players
Unión de Sunchales footballers
9 de Julio de Rafaela players
Sportspeople from Santa Fe Province